Mei Wu (Chinese: 梅武; Pinyin: Méi Wǔ) a character featured within the classic Chinese novel Fengshen Yanyi.

Mei Wu has been a high-ranking officer under the renowned Shang Dynasty for many a year, and has gained great renown for his loyalty. Following Chong Houhu's coalition against the rebel leader, Su Hu, Mei Wu would be the right hand general serving under the Chong. After Chong finally arrived at the gates to Su Hu's Ji province, Mei Wu had been the first general to respond to the duke's call -- the capture of Su Hu. 

When the renowned Mei Wu appeared before Su Hu, he could be seen riding atop a chestnut stallion, wearing bright golden armor, a Phoenix Wing's helmet, and a bright red robe with a lion-headed belt. After the son of Su Hu - Su Quanzhong - appeared as Su Hu's protecter, Mei Wu shouted these words at him: "Su Quanzhong! You, father and son, are committing a capital crime! You know the king's army can very easily overwhelm your region and destroy your ancestral shrine!" Thus, Mei Wu, who wielded a golden axe, charged at Quanzhong; a fine duel then ensued between the two great warriors. After the two warriors had fought for more than twenty rounds, Quanzhong finally found an opening and slashed Mei Wu off his horse with his spear. A major battle then ensued, resulting in the fleeing of Chong, and the death of the great Mei Wu.

Mei Wu was appointed as the deity of Tiankong Star (天空星) in the end.

Notes

References
 Investiture of the Gods - Chapter 2 (pages 21-22)

Investiture of the Gods characters